Terence Flanagan (born 1 January 1975) is an Irish Fine Gael politician who has served as a Dublin City Councillor since May 2019. He previously served as a Teachta Dála (TD) for the Dublin North-East constituency from 2007 to 2016.

He was a member of Dublin City Council from 2003 until 2007, originally co-opted onto the council to replace Richard Bruton, due to the ending of dual mandates in September 2003, he was elected to the Council in 2004 obtaining 2594 first preference votes. Upon Flanagan's election to the Dáil in 2007  for the now defunct Dublin North East Constituency, his brother Declan Flanagan P.C was co-opted onto the City Council as his replacement.

In February 2008, Flanagan made a speech which was notably similar to a previous one by Labour Party TD Joan Burton. He initially denied that the speech was copied, but later issued a statement admitting and apologising for the plagiarism. He was Fine Gael deputy spokesperson on the Environment, with special responsibility for Housing, from October 2007 to March 2011. Flanagan was re-elected to the Dáil in February 2011 with 12,332 first preference votes.

Flanagan was expelled from the Fine Gael parliamentary party on 2 July 2013, when he defied the party whip by voting against the Protection of Life During Pregnancy Bill 2013. On 13 September 2013, he and six other expellees formed the Reform Alliance, described as a "loose alliance" rather than a political party.

On 13 March 2015, Renua Ireland was launched, with Flanagan as one of its three sitting TDs and many other Reform Alliance members as declared election candidates. Later that day Flanagan represented the party in an interview on RTÉ's Drivetime radio news programme, where he was unable to answer any questions about the party's policies.

Flanagan stood as a Renua Ireland candidate for the new Dublin Bay North constituency at the 2016 general election, but lost his seat, being eliminated at the 9th count.

In April 2017, it was announced that he would rejoin Fine Gael.

In November 2018, he was selected by local Fine Gael branches to be a candidate in the Donaghmede Local Electoral Area of Dublin City Council to contest the 2019 Local Elections. In April 2019, he was warned by Dublin City Council litter wardens for breach of regulations after putting up election posters in advance of the permitted day. He claimed he was at a disadvantage for having done so. He was also forced to apologise after his poster erections at 3am alarmed an elderly woman.

Flanagan was elected to Dublin City Council in the 2019 local elections, in the Donaghmede LEA.

References

 

1975 births
Living people
Fine Gael TDs
Independent TDs
Local councillors in Dublin (city)
Members of the 30th Dáil
Members of the 31st Dáil
Politicians from County Dublin
Renua Ireland TDs
Alumni of Dublin Business School
People educated at Chanel College, Dublin